Naguva Hoovu is a 1971 Indian Kannada language film, directed by cinematographer R. N. K. Prasad, produced by actor R. N. Sudarshan and written by actress Shylashri. Besides Sudarshan and Shylashri, the film stars K. S. Ashwath, Ranga, R. Nagendra Rao and B. V. Radha in pivotal roles. The film won the National Film Award for Best Feature Film in Kannada at the 18th National Film Awards.
The film had musical score and soundtrack composed by G. K. Venkatesh to the lyrics of R. N. Jayagopal.

Cast
 Sudarshan
 Shylashri 
 Ranga
 K. S. Ashwath  
 R. Nagendra Rao
 B. V. Radha
 Balakrishna
 Ganapathi Bhat
 Thoogudeepa Srinivas
 Vijayasree
 B. Jayashree
 Master Chandrashekar
 Hanumanthachar
 Vijayakumar
 B. Jaya

Soundtrack

Awards
 1970-71 - National Film Award for Best Feature Film in Kannada
 This film screened at IFFI 1992 Kannada cinema Retrospect.

References

External links 

 Naguva Hoovu Songs at Raaga

1971 films
1970s Kannada-language films
Indian black-and-white films
Films scored by G. K. Venkatesh
Best Kannada Feature Film National Film Award winners